The 2008 Wake Forest Demon Deacons football team represented Wake Forest University during the 2008 NCAA Division I FBS football season. It was Wake Forest's 56th season as a member of the Atlantic Coast Conference (ACC).

The Demon Deacons were led by eighth-year head coach Jim Grobe. Wake Forest played its home games at BB&T Field. The Deacons began their season on August 28 at Baylor. A win in the 2007 Meineke Car Care Bowl against UConn gave the Deacons twenty wins over the last two seasons.

The team is finished 8–5 overall and 4–4 in ACC play, and beat Navy in the inaugural EagleBank Bowl on December 20.

Before the season

Roster changes
Quarterback Zach MacDowell enrolled Coastal Carolina University in January, and will play there starting in 2008.

Running back Lucas Caparelli was dismissed from the university after an off the field incident in January.

Recruiting
On National Signing Day, the Demon Deacons received letters of intent from 17 players.
 Andrew Parker TE 6–5 225 Jacksonville, Florida Bartram Trail
 Terence Davis WR 6–1 180 Lilburn, Georgia Brookwood
 Gabe Irby OL 6–3 315 Mt. Airy, Georgia Habersham Central
 Ted Stachitas QB 6–3 185 Ponte Vedra Beach, Florida Nease
 Derricus Ellis DE 6–2 225 Rome, Georgia Darlington School
 Joey Ehrmann LB 6–4 210 Baltimore, Maryland Gilman
 Ramon Booi DL 6–6 330 Jacksonville, Florida Nease
 Scott Betros LB 6–1 220 Jacksonville, Florida Bolles School
 Riley Haynes LB 6–1 225 Jacksonville, Florida Nease
 Kevin Smith DE 6–4 210 Plano, Texas East
 Lovell Jackson RB 5–10 170 Tampa, Florida Plant
 Garrick Williams OL 6–4 314 Columbia, Missouri Rock Bridge
 J.T. Dixon TE 6–4 230 Chandler, Arizona Hargrave Military
 Chance Raines OL 6–2 270 Jacksonville, Florida Bolles School
 Joe Looney OL 6–3 315 Lake Worth, Florida Lake Worth
 Kenny Okoro CB 6–0 185 Greensboro, North Carolina Dudley
 Chris Givens RB 6–0 200 Wylie, Texas Wylie

Schedule

Roster

Coaching staff
After the 2007 season, The Deacons had two assistant coaches accept other coaching positions. Defensive Coordinator Dean Hood accepted the head coaching job at Eastern Kentucky. Quarterbacks coach Jeff Mullen left the Deacons to assume the Offensive coordinator position at West Virginia.

Game summaries

@ Baylor

In front of a national television audience, Riley Skinner threw for three touchdowns, including two to Chip Brinkman. Josh Adams and Brandon Pendergrass added touchdown runs in a lopsided 41–13 scoreline. Alphonso Smith and Alex Frye notched interceptions for the Deacons, who won their first ever game in the state of Texas.

Ole Miss

Sam Swank's 42 yd FG with three seconds remaining gave Wake Forest a thrilling 30–28 win over Ole Miss. In a game with several lead changes, Ole Miss took the lead with just over one minute remaining in the fourth quarter. Wake quarterback Riley Skinner led the Deacons down the field in 53 seconds to set up Swank's game-winning field goal.

@ Florida State

In a game that featured no touchdowns, Sam Swank made four field goals to lead the Demon Deacons to a 12–3 win in Tallahassee. The win was the Deacons' second consecutive win in Tallahassee, and the third straight overall over the Seminoles. The Wake Forest defense was stout, allowing Florida State under 250 yards of offense, and forcing seven turnovers, including five interceptions.

Navy

Eric Kettani ran for a career-high 175 yards and backup quarterback Jarod Bryant scored the decisive touchdown in the fourth quarter, as Navy came into Winston-Salem and upset Wake Forest 24–17.

Clemson

Riley Skinner's 7-yard touchdown pass to DJ Boldin with 5:28 to go gave the Deacons a 12–7 win against Clemson. In a defensive battle, the Deacons' defense managed to hold Clemson to less than one yard per carry. Wake Forest dominated the game statistically but were unable to capitalize on several scoring chances. The sole turnover in the game was a Cullen Harper pass intercepted by Alphonso Smith, who tied a school record with his 17th career interception. Riley Skinner also threw for 186 yards and a touchdown on 22-of-34 passing, and also added 73 yards on the ground.

@ Maryland

Chris Turner completed 28-of-41 passes for 321 yards and a touchdown, and Maryland knocked off another top-25 team with a 26–0 thumping of No. 21 Wake Forest.

@ Miami

Wake Forest was not able to maintain a halftime lead in falling against Miami. The Deacons were unable to mount much offense in the second half, and a Robert Marve QB sneak in the third quarter ended up being the game-winner. Fullback Mike Rinfrette scored the lone Deacons touchdown on a one-yard run on Wake's first offensive series.

Duke

In a back and forth affair, Wake Forest held off Duke 33–30 in an overtime battle. Alphonso Smith blocked a punt for a safety and had two interceptions for the Deacons, including one in overtime to end the game. Riley Skinner had a touchdown pass to DJ Boldin, and also scored on a quarterback sneak. The Blue Devils had their chance to win at the end of regulation, but missed a 42-yard field goal that would have won it. Aaron Curry led the Deacons with 16 tackles.

Virginia

On homecoming weekend in Winston-Salem, the Demon Deacons dazzled fans en route to a 28–3 halftime advantage. Riley Skinner threw two touchdown passes in the first half, including a 58-yard strike to Devon Brown. Kevin Patterson gave the Wake defense their first touchdown of the season, as e brought back a UVA pass for a 53-yard touchdown. Wake Forest turned more conservative in the second half, and allowed UVA to pick up a pair of fourth-quarter touchdowns, but the lead was safe, and the Deacons claimed bowl eligibility for the third consecutive season.

@ NC State

Russell Wilson threw the game-winning touchdown to Anthony Hill will ten minutes remaining, and NC State held off Wake Forest 21–17 in Raleigh. DJ Boldin had a hand in both Wake touchdowns, throwing a pass to Marshall Williams for a 64-yard touchdown, and catching a 7 yarder of his own. Williams had his first career 100 yard receiving day, grabbing 7 balls for 116 yards.

Boston College

Backup quarterback Dominique Davis scored on a one-yard quarterback sneak in the final minutes to send Wake Forest to their second straight close defeat. In a defensive battle, the Demon Deacon defense scored two touchdowns, and a punt block set up the third. Kevin Patterson and Kyle Wilbur returned fumbles for touchdowns, and Rich Belton caught a 1-yard touchdown pass from Riley Skinner. This game also saw the return of kicker Sam Swank, who missed several weeks with injury.

Vanderbilt

Three different Deacons ran for touchdowns as Wake held off Vanderbilt 23–10 in each team's regular season finale. Brandon Pendergrass, Kevin Harris, and Rich Belton got in the endzone, and Alphonso Smith tied the ACC record for career interceptions. The win guaranteed Wake Forest their third consecutive winning season.

vs. Navy–EagleBank Bowl

Wake Forest scored 29 points in the last 31 minutes of action to win the inaugural EagleBank Bowl, and took revenge on Navy for a regular season defeat. Josh Adams got in the end zone twice for Wake Forest, who also got touchdowns from Ben Wooster and Rich Belton. Alphonso Smith intercepted a second quarter pass to break Dre Bly's ACC record for career interceptions. The Deacons outrushed the potent Navy option attack, led by a career-high 136 yards from Kevin Harris, and Riley Skinner set a FBS bowl record by completing eleven passes without an incompletion.

Postseason

Conference
 All-ACC First Team
DJ Boldin (WR)
Aaron Curry (LB)
Alphonso Smith (CB)
 All-ACC Honorable Mention
Boo Robinson (DE)
Riley Skinner (QB)

National
 Aaron Curry (LB)- 2008 Butkus Award Winner, 2nd Team AP All-American, 2nd Team Sporting News All-American, 2nd Team Rivals.com All-American
 Alphonso Smith (CB)- 1st Team AP All-American, 2nd Team Sporting News All-American, 2nd Team Rivals.com All-American

Roster changes

Rankings

Scores by quarter

References

Wake Forest
Wake Forest Demon Deacons football seasons
Military Bowl champion seasons
Wake Forest Demon Deacons football